Buttermilk Ski Area refers to a ski hill and an unincorporated community surrounding it in Pitkin County, Colorado. Located about halfway between the cities of Aspen and Snowmass Village, it is frequently considered the easiest skiing mountain in the area. Buttermilk has also been the host to the ESPN Winter X Games multiple times. It contains three ski areas: Tiehack (difficult), Main Buttermilk (regular), and West Buttermilk (easy). Art Pfister developed Buttermilk Mountain ski area in 1958.　It was part of the original Aspen trio of 1960s: Aspen Mountain (ski area), Aspen Highlands, and Aspen Buttermilk. 
 
Buttermilk is anchored by three high speed quads. The Summit Express services trails in the Main Buttermilk section of the mountain. The West Buttermilk Express, built in 2004, services beginner terrain on the west face of the mountain. The Tiehack Express, built in 2011, services advanced and intermediate terrain on the west face of Buttermilk Mountain. Buttermilk is known as one of the best beginner mountains in North America, to learn ski or snowboard. Its base includes The Hideout — an integrated play-and-learning area for children in ski school ages 2 ½ to 6 years old.

In February 2014, Nancy Pfister was found brutally murdered in a walk-in closet of her home in Buttermilk. The case made headlines across the country, and has been featured on Dateline and Snapped.

References

Ski areas and resorts in Colorado
Aspen Skiing Company
Buildings and structures in Pitkin County, Colorado
Tourist attractions in Pitkin County, Colorado